Il castello delle cerimonie (previously titled Il boss delle cerimonie; known in the UK as My Crazy Italian Wedding) is a 2014 Italian weekday television series, that currently airs on TLC (originally on Real Time), originally hosted by Antonio Polese. It takes place at the Grand Hotel La Sonrisa.

Antonio Polese died on December 1, 2016, aged 80, at the Pineta Grande Clinic in Castel Volturno because of the heart failure he had suffered from since October. However, it was confirmed that some episodes for the fifth season had already been filmed, and that Real Time would broadcast such episodes during the spring of 2017. Following these episodes there would be others without Don Antonio.

Since October 6, 2017 the sixth season of the program has aired, which, following the death of Don Antonio (the Boss), changed its title into Il castello delle cerimonie ("The Castle of Ceremonies"). His place was taken by his daughter Donna Imma Polese.

Cast
Don Antonio – the star of the show, owner of the location until the 5th season.
Donna Imma – the star of the show from the 6th season, taking her father's place.
Matteo – director, Don Antonio's son-in-law.
Ferdinando – maître d'hôtel.

Seasons

References

External links
 Il castello delle cerimonie on real time.it

TLC (TV network) original programming
2010s Italian television series